The 2011–12 UNLV Runnin' Rebels men's basketball team represented the University of Nevada, Las Vegas. The team was coached by Dave Rice, in his first year with the Runnin' Rebels. They played their home games at the Thomas & Mack Center on UNLV's main campus in Las Vegas, Nevada and are a member of the Mountain West Conference. UNLV's season ended with 26–9 overall, and 9–5 in MWC Play, placing third. They lost in the semifinals of the Mountain West Basketball tournament by New Mexico. They received an at-large bid to the 2012 NCAA tournament where they lost in the second round to Colorado.

Roster

Rankings

*AP does not release post-NCAA Tournament rankings.

Schedule and results 

|-
!colspan=9| Exhibition

|-
!colspan=9| Regular season

|-
!colspan=9| 2012 Mountain West Conference men's basketball tournament

|-
!colspan=9| 2012 NCAA tournament

References 

Unlv
UNLV Runnin' Rebels basketball seasons
Unlv
Run
Run